Reigning champion Hazel Hotchkiss won the singles tennis title of the 1910 U.S. Women's National Singles Championship by defeating Louise Hammond 6–4, 6–2 in the challenge round. Hammond had won the right to challenge Hotchkiss by defeating Adelaide Browning 6–2, 6–4 in the final of the All Comers' competition. The event was played on outdoor grass courts and held at the Philadelphia Cricket Club in Wissahickon Heights, Chestnut Hill, Philadelphia, from June 20 through June 26, 1910.

Draw

Challenge round

All Comers' finals

References

1910
1910 in women's tennis
June 1910 sports events
1910 in American women's sports
Women's Singles
Chestnut Hill, Philadelphia
1910s in Philadelphia
1910 in sports in Pennsylvania
Women's sports in Pennsylvania